Michael Brian Bullard (born March 10, 1961) is a Canadian former professional ice hockey centre who played 11 seasons in the National Hockey League between 1980–81 and 1991–92.

Playing career
As a youth, Bullard played in the 1974 Quebec International Pee-Wee Hockey Tournament with a minor ice hockey team from East Ottawa.

Bullard was drafted 9th overall by the Pittsburgh Penguins in the 1980 NHL Entry Draft. In his NHL career he played for the Penguins, Calgary Flames, St. Louis Blues, Philadelphia Flyers, and the Toronto Maple Leafs. He played in Switzerland in 1990 for one season for the HC Ambrì-Piotta in the NDA before moving to the Leafs and then spent ten seasons in Germany before calling time on his playing career in 2003. Playing for EV Landshut he was the Bundesliga's top scorer and player of the year for 1993–94.

Starting in 2003 Bullard coached the 2nd Bundesliga club SERC Wild Wings, later switching to Austrian club Graz 99ers, before he decided to return to Germany to coach ESV Kaufbeuren. After these stations he returned to his longtime employer, the Landshut Cannibals, to coach the team for the 2008–09 season.

For the 2009–2010 season, he became the general manager of the Brantford Eagles and the following season, he became the team's coach as well. As of 2018, Bullard is the head coach of the Caledonia Corvairs of the GOJHL.

Career statistics

Regular season and playoffs

International

See also
List of NHL players with 100-point seasons

References

External links
 

1961 births
Brantford Alexanders players
Calgary Flames players
Canadian ice hockey left wingers
Eisbären Berlin players
EV Landshut players
Heilbronner EC players
HC Ambrì-Piotta players
Ice hockey people from Ottawa
National Hockey League first-round draft picks
Philadelphia Flyers players
Pittsburgh Penguins draft picks
Pittsburgh Penguins players
SC Rapperswil-Jona Lakers players
St. Louis Blues players
Schwenninger Wild Wings players
Toronto Maple Leafs players
Living people
Canadian expatriate ice hockey players in Germany
Canadian expatriate ice hockey players in Switzerland